Fernando José Gomes Pinto (born 7 April 1969), better known as Fua, is an Angolan footballer who played as a winger. He played in three matches for the Angola national football team in 1996. He was also named in Angola's squad for the 1996 African Cup of Nations tournament.

References

External links

1969 births
Living people
Footballers from Luanda
Angolan footballers
Angola international footballers
1996 African Cup of Nations players
Association football wingers
C.D. Estarreja players
A.D. Ovarense players
Leça F.C. players
F.C. Maia players
S.C.U. Torreense players
Associação Académica de Coimbra – O.A.F. players
Boavista F.C. players
U.D. Leiria players
Moreirense F.C. players
Oxford United F.C. players
S.C. Pombal players
F.C. Pedras Rubras players
Primeira Liga players
Liga Portugal 2 players
Campeonato de Portugal (league) players
Angolan expatriate footballers
Angolan expatriate sportspeople in Portugal
Angolan expatriate sportspeople in England
Expatriate footballers in Portugal
Expatriate footballers in England